Blanchett Lovan Moody (March 17, 1912 – October 27, 1940) was an American Negro league pitcher who played in 1940.

A native of Boyce, Louisiana, Moody played for the Birmingham Black Barons in 1940. In nine recorded appearances on the mound, he posted a 5.75 ERA over 36 innings. He was run over by a train while working as a cotton laborer in Eloy, Arizona later that year.

References

External links
 and Seamheads

1912 births
1940 deaths
Birmingham Black Barons players
Railway accident deaths in the United States
People from Rapides Parish, Louisiana